Leeds South East was a borough constituency in the city of Leeds in West Yorkshire.  It returned one Member of Parliament (MP)  to the House of Commons of the Parliament of the United Kingdom.

The constituency was created for the 1918 general election, and abolished for the 1983 general election.

Boundaries
1918–1950: The County Borough of Leeds wards of East and East Hunslet, and part of North East ward.

1950–1955: The County Borough of Leeds wards of Crossgates and Temple Newsam, East Hunslet, and Osmondthorpe.

1955–1974: The County Borough of Leeds wards of Blenheim, City, East Hunslet, Richmond Hill, and Westfield.

1974–1983: The County Borough of Leeds wards of Burley, Burmantofts, City, Richmond Hill, and Woodhouse.

Leeds city centre was in the constituency from 1955 until the seat disappeared in 1983 since when it has been in Leeds Central.

Members of Parliament

Election results

Elections in the 1910s

Elections in the 1920s

Elections in the 1930s 

General Election 1939–40

Another General Election was required to take place before the end of 1940. The political parties had been making preparations for an election to take place and by the Autumn of 1939, the following candidates had been selected; 
Labour: James Milner
Conservative:

Elections in the 1940s

Elections in the 1950s

Elections in the 1960s

Elections in the 1970s

References 

 

Parliamentary constituencies in Yorkshire and the Humber (historic)
Constituencies of the Parliament of the United Kingdom established in 1918
Constituencies of the Parliament of the United Kingdom disestablished in 1983
Politics of Leeds